Sheldon Harris may refer to:

Sheldon H. Harris, American historian, author of Factories of Death: Japanese Biological War
Sheldon Harris (music historian), American amateur jazz and blues historian, author of Blues Who's Who